Girl Playing the Lyre is a sculpture by Adolf von Hildebrand. It is part of the collection of Alte Nationalgalerie in Berlin, Germany.

Sculptures of women in Germany